This is a list of battleships of the Second World War. All displacements are at standard load, in metric tonnes, so as to avoid confusion over their relative displacements. [Note: Not all displacements have been adjusted to match this yet]. Ideally displacements will be as they were at either the end of the war, or when the ship was sunk.

The battleship was a capital ship built in the first half of the 20th century. At the outbreak of war, large fleets of battleships—many inherited from the dreadnought era decades before—were considered one of the decisive forces in naval warfare. There were two engagements between battleships in the Pacific theatre and three in the Atlantic theatre. Battleships were the most heavily protected ships afloat, nonetheless sixteen were sunk or crippled by bombs or torpedoes delivered by aircraft, while three more were sunk by submarine-launched torpedoes. Guided bombs developed during the war made it much easier for aircraft to sink battleships. By the end of the war, battleship construction was all but halted, and almost every existing battleship was retired or scrapped within a few years of its end. The Second World War saw the end of the battleship as the dominant force in the world's navies.

The List of ships of World War II contains major military vessels of the war, arranged alphabetically and by type. The list includes armed vessels that served during the war and in the immediate aftermath, inclusive of localized ongoing combat operations, garrison surrenders, post-surrender occupation, colony re-occupation, troop and prisoner repatriation, to the end of 1945. For smaller vessels, see also List of World War II ships of less than 1000 tons.

See also

 List of battleships

References

Bibliography

Battleships
 
World War II